Gordon Dwight Carruthers (born November 7, 1944) is a Canadian former professional ice hockey defenceman who played in two National Hockey League (NHL) games, one with the Detroit Red Wings in 1966 and the other with the Philadelphia Flyers in 1967. The rest of his career, which lasted from 1965 to 1976, was spent in various minor leagues.

Career statistics

Regular season and playoffs

External links
 

1944 births
Living people
Amarillo Wranglers players
Canadian expatriate ice hockey players in the United States
Canadian ice hockey defencemen
Detroit Red Wings players
Ice hockey people from Saskatchewan
Johnstown Jets players
Philadelphia Flyers players
San Diego Gulls (WHL) players
Seattle Totems (WHL) players
Spokane Jets players
Weyburn Red Wings players